Torrington was a county constituency centred on the town of Torrington in Devon. It returned one Member of Parliament (MP)  to the House of Commons of the Parliament of the United Kingdom from 1950 until it was abolished for the February 1974 general election.

An earlier constituency called Torrington, a parliamentary borough consisting only of the town itself, returned members to some of the parliaments of the Middle Ages; it was not represented after 1372.

Boundaries
The Municipal Boroughs of Bideford, Great Torrington, and Okehampton, the Urban Districts of Crediton and Northam, and the Rural Districts of Bideford, Crediton, Okehampton, and Torrington.

History

The medieval borough
Torrington, sometimes referred to as Chipping Torrington, was one of a number of English boroughs that were represented in Parliament only intermittently during the Middle Ages, and eventually lost the right completely; at this period, writs of election were directed to the sheriff of each county, and it was left to their discretion which towns were summoned to send burgesses. Torrington is unusual, however, in that clear evidence of its reluctance to return members survives - the cost of supporting its two MPs was considered much too detrimental to be offset by any benefits that came from being represented. Late in the reign of Edward III, the townsmen of Torrington petitioned the king
That they ought not to be so burdened with sending men, neither did they send any before the 21st of his reign, when the Sheriff maliciously returned into the Chancery, that the said town was a Borough, and so, from that year, by Pretext of the said Return, the town has been many times put to great pains and expenses, to their no small grievance and damage, and manifest impoverishing.
The petition was not entirely accurate, for Torrington had sent members to some 17 parliaments before  the sheriff's "malicious" action, although it was true that the town was not represented in the three immediately preceding that date. The King accepted the petition, and granted Torrington a Patent of Exemption from being required to send members to Parliament; yet, notwithstanding this, they were called upon again to send MPs to two Parliaments in the next three years. After this, however, Torrington's name appears no more on the list of boroughs.

As time passed, and the benefits of representation in Parliament became more obvious, the town repented of its earlier action. Around three centuries later, at the time of the Restoration of Charles II, Torrington petitioned to be restored to its ancient rights and allowed once more to return Members of Parliament. The petition was unavailing.

The modern county constituency
A new Torrington constituency was created by the Representation of the People Act 1948 as part of the boundary changes that came into effect at the general election of 1950. It was a county constituency, one of six in Devon, and covered central and western parts of the county. Though named after Great Torrington, its largest town was Bideford.

The constituency was a highly rural one dominated by farming, and was assumed to be an entirely safe seat for the Conservatives and their allies. However, when George Lambert (who had won the seat three times with large majorities) inherited a peerage in 1958, the resulting by-election was sensationally won by Mark Bonham-Carter for the Liberals, the first sign of the Liberals' national revival which continued at other by-elections across the country over the next fifteen years. The Conservatives recaptured the seat at the following year's general election, and retained it for the remainder of its existence, but it remained marginal until the 1970 general election.

The Torrington constituency was abolished with effect from the February 1974 general election (at which Devon's county constituencies were reduced by one) being divided between the revised North Devon and Tiverton constituencies and the new West Devon.

Members of Parliament

Election results

Elections in the 1950s

Elections in the 1960s

Elections in the 1970s

References

Bibliography
 Charles Henry Parry, The Parliaments and Councils of England (London: John Murray, 1839)
 Edward Porritt and Annie G Porritt, The Unreformed House of Commons (Cambridge University Press, 1903)
 Frederic A Youngs, jr, Guide to the Local Administrative Units of England, Vol I (London: Royal Historical Society, 1979)
 

Parliamentary constituencies in Devon (historic)
Constituencies of the Parliament of the United Kingdom established in 1950
Constituencies of the Parliament of the United Kingdom disestablished in 1974